SilkRoad Technology, Inc. is a human capital management software company.
 SilkRoad Technology is headquartered in Chicago, Illinois, and has regional offices around the world. The company has more than 1,000 mid-market and enterprise clients, including Accenture, IBM, eBay, L'Oréal, and Clear Channel Communications.

The company ranked #4 in The Business Journal’s list of 50 Top-Performing Private Companies.

History
SilkRoad Technology, Inc. was founded in North Carolina in 2003 by Andrew "Flip" Filipowski with Eprise, and launched at the Human Resource Executive Technology Conference and Expo in Chicago in 2005.

SilkRoad Technology acquired OpenHire, based in Winston-Salem in 2004.

SilkRoad Technology acquired VTN Technologies, Inc., the creator of Olé Online Learning Environment training software, in 2008. The company also opened offices in Asia and the Pacific Rim.

The company headquarters relocated to Chicago in 2010, but the Boston, Jacksonville and Winston-Salem locations are the primary design and development centers.

In 2019 SilkRoad Technology began providing Strategic Consulting Services.

In 2022 SilkRoad Technology purchased the assets of Entelo, adding market-established candidate search, candidate marketing, candidate interviewing and search/marketing outsourcing capabilities.

Locations

SilkRoad Technology's corporate headquarters are in Chicago with US offices in Boston, Jacksonville, Florida, Red Bank, New Jersey, San Francisco, and Winston-Salem, North Carolina.

SilkRoad Technology operates in facilities around the globe, including  Edmonton, Alberta, Canada; London, England; Paris, France; Düsseldorf, Germany; Copenhagen, Denmark; Singapore; Sydney, Australia; Hong Kong; Shanghai, China; Tokyo, Japan; Osaka, Japan; Taguig, Philippines; Auckland, New Zealand, and Belgrade, Serbia.

Products

References

Software companies based in Illinois
Companies based in Chicago
Multinational companies
Human resource management consulting firms
Consulting firms established in 2003
Technology companies established in 2003
2003 establishments in North Carolina
Software companies of the United States